The R. A. Stranahan Arboretum 47 acres (190,000 m²) is located at 4131 Tantara Drive, Toledo, Ohio, about a 10-minute drive from the main campus of the University of Toledo. It contains 1,500 specimens of cultivated, mature trees from China, Serbia, Japan, and Norway, as well as North American varieties ranging from Bristlecone Pine to Buckeye.

The Arboretum site includes cultivated ornamental trees, rolling lawns, natural woods, ponds, wetlands and a restored prairie, all located within the "Oak Openings" sand dune region. About one-quarter of the Arboretum is covered by forest. The older forest has not been cleared for over 150 years and has oaks as the dominant tree. Peaks of old sand dunes are visible beneath its undergrowth. The newer forest is 50 years old, with has red maple as the dominant tree.

The Arboretum was donated to the University of Toledo in 1964 by the W. W. Knight family, in memory of Robert Stranahan.

See also
 List of botanical gardens in the United States

External links
 Official Site

Arboreta in Ohio
Botanical gardens in Ohio
University of Toledo
Protected areas of Lucas County, Ohio
Parks in Toledo, Ohio